Arnold Franqui (born 10 January 1963) is a Puerto Rican weightlifter. He competed in the men's light heavyweight event at the 1992 Summer Olympics.

References

1963 births
Living people
Puerto Rican male weightlifters
Olympic weightlifters of Puerto Rico
Weightlifters at the 1992 Summer Olympics
Central American and Caribbean Games medalists in weightlifting
Place of birth missing (living people)
20th-century Puerto Rican people